Herman Lehlbach (July 3, 1845January 11, 1904) was an American Republican Party politician who represented New Jersey's 6th congressional district in the United States House of Representatives for three terms from 1885 to 1891.

He was the uncle of Frederick R. Lehlbach, who represented the state in Congress from 1915 to 1937.

Early life and career
Born in Heiligkreuzsteinach in the Grand Duchy of Baden, Lehlbach immigrated to the United States in 1851 with his parents, who settled in Newark, New Jersey.
He attended the public schools and became a civil engineer.
He served as member of the New Jersey General Assembly from 1884 to 1891.

Congress
Lehlbach was elected as a Republican to the Forty-ninth, Fiftieth, and Fifty-first Congresses, serving in office from March 4, 1885 to March 3, 1891, but was not a candidate for renomination in 1890.

Later career and death
After leaving Congress, he resumed the practice of his profession as a civil engineer in Newark, and was Sheriff of Essex County, New Jersey from 1893 to 1896.
He died in Newark, on January 11, 1904.
He was interred Fairmount Cemetery in Newark.

External links

Herman Lehlbach at The Political Graveyard

1845 births
1904 deaths
Republican Party members of the New Jersey General Assembly
Politicians from Newark, New Jersey
German emigrants to the United States
Burials at Fairmount Cemetery (Newark, New Jersey)
Republican Party members of the United States House of Representatives from New Jersey
19th-century American politicians